Sérgio Filipe Dias Ribeiro (born 16 June 1985), commonly known as Serginho, is a Portuguese professional footballer who plays as an attacking midfielder for AO Megisti.

Club career
Born in Porto, Serginho started his career with F.C. Pedras Rubras, playing his first two seasons as a senior in the third division. He moved abroad in 2005, signing with Bulgarian club FC Vihren Sandanski.

On 7 August 2005, Serginho made his A Football Group debut, in a 3–1 home win against PFC Beroe Stara Zagora. Towards the end of the campaign he scored his first league goal, helping to a 2–0 home success over PFC Naftex Burgas on 20 May.

Serginho spent the following three and a half seasons in Greece, his only top level experience being in 2009–10 with Levadiakos FC (22 matches, one goal, team relegation). In January 2011 he returned to Bulgaria, going on to represent PFC Lokomotiv Plovdiv and PFC CSKA Sofia.

In the following years, in quick succession, Serginho played for FC Metalurh Zaporizhya (Ukrainian Premier League), Athlitiki Enosi Larissa FC, PAS Lamia 1964 and Trikala, all in the Greek second tier. He dropped to the third division of the latter country on 13 January 2017, signing with Ergotelis FC.

Club statistics

References

External links

1985 births
Living people
Footballers from Porto
Portuguese footballers
Association football midfielders
Segunda Divisão players
First Professional Football League (Bulgaria) players
OFC Vihren Sandanski players
PFC Lokomotiv Plovdiv players
PFC CSKA Sofia players
Super League Greece players
Football League (Greece) players
Pierikos F.C. players
Levadiakos F.C. players
PAS Lamia 1964 players
Athlitiki Enosi Larissa F.C. players
Trikala F.C. players
Ergotelis F.C. players
Ukrainian Premier League players
FC Metalurh Zaporizhzhia players
Portuguese expatriate footballers
Expatriate footballers in Bulgaria
Expatriate footballers in Greece
Expatriate footballers in Ukraine
Portuguese expatriate sportspeople in Bulgaria
Portuguese expatriate sportspeople in Greece
Portuguese expatriate sportspeople in Ukraine